"Motorcycle Mama" is  a song written by John Wyker and performed by Sailcat.  It reached #12 on both the U.S. pop chart and the U.S. adult contemporary chart in 1972 and was featured on their 1972 album Motorcycle Mama.

Produced by Pete Carr, the song ranked #89 on Billboard magazine's Top 100 singles of 1972.

Charts

Other versions
The Sugarcubes, on the 1990 compilation album Rubáiyát: Elektra's 40th Anniversary.

References

1972 songs
1972 debut singles
Elektra Records singles